The 2000–01 Wisconsin Badgers men's basketball team represented University of Wisconsin–Madison. The head coach was Dick Bennett, coaching his sixth season with the Badgers. Bennett resigned after the third game of the season citing burnout – he said he "simply was drained". Assistant coach Brad Soderberg took over as the interim head coach for the remainder of the season. The team played its home games at the Kohl Center in Madison, Wisconsin and was a member of the Big Ten Conference. Wisconsin finished 18–11, 9–7 in Big Ten play to finish in fifth place. The Badgers received an at-large bid to the NCAA tournament as the No. 6 seed in the West Region, where they were upset by Georgia State, 50–49.

Roster

Schedule

|-
!colspan=12| Regular Season

|-
!colspan=12| Big Ten tournament

|-
!colspan=12| NCAA tournament

References

Wisconsin Badgers men's basketball seasons
Wisconsin
Wisconsin
Badge
Badge